Lawrence was a provincial riding in Ontario, Canada.  It was created prior to the 1987 provincial election from the parts of York South, Downsview, Wilson Heights and Armourdale and eliminated in 1996, when it was split between the ridings of York South—Weston and Eglinton—Lawrence.

Members of Provincial Parliament

Election results

References

Notes

Citations

Former provincial electoral districts of Ontario
Provincial electoral districts of Toronto